General elections were held in Belgium on 8 November 1981. Voter turnout was 94.5% in the Chamber election and 94.6% in the Senate election. Elections were also held for the nine provincial councils and for the Council of the German Cultural Community. They were the first elections after the voting age was lowered from 21 to 18. This contributed to the success of the socialist parties and the green parties (Agalev and Ecolo). 

The traditionally largest Christian People's Party saw significant losses, with only 43 of the 212 seats in the Chamber of Representatives. The result was considered an election upset.

Results

Chamber of Representatives

Senate

References

1981 elections in Belgium
November 1981 events in Europe